

Tallest buildings

Notes
 G1 Tower rises to a height of 214 metres (700 ft) tall, making it the tallest structure in the prefecture.
 Kyoto Tower rises to a height of 131 metres (430 ft) tall, making it the tallest structure in the prefecture.
A replica of the Dom Tower of Utrecht at the Huis Ten Bosch theme park rises to a height of 105 metres (344 ft) tall, making it the tallest structure in the prefecture.
Tokyo Skytree rises to a height of 634 metres (2,080 ft) tall, making it the tallest structure in Japan.
The building's roof antenna increases its total height of 106 metres (347 ft).

References

Prefecture
Tallest